= Kampung Merinding =

Kampung Merinding is a village in Federal Territory of Labuan, Malaysia.
